Tougouni is a small town and commune in the Cercle of Koulikoro in the Koulikoro Region of south-western Mali. As of 1998 the commune had a population of 8579.

References

Communes of Koulikoro Region